Toplofikatsiya Plovdiv is the district heating company in the city of Plovdiv in Southern Bulgaria. It is one of the largest district heating networks in the country, also supplying heat energy to the town of Asenovgrad, around 10 km to the southeast, and serves a total of 35 000 customers.

As of 2007, Toplofikatsiya Plovdiv is wholly owned by Austrian company EVN, which also holds the electricity distribution monopoly for the whole of southeastern Bulgaria. Since it was taken over by EVN, Toplofikatsiya Plovdiv's official name is "EVN Toplofikatsiya Bulgaria".

Toplofikatsiya Plovdiv has two power stations – one of which is a cogeneration plant and the other a heat-only boiler station.

According to the company's website, the Plovdiv North cogeneration plant was renovated in 2011 with extra capacity of an extra 50 MWe and an extra 54 MWt, brought into exploitation in Sept 2011, although the original plans were for an extra 123 MWt of heating capacity to be constructed.

References

External links 

 evn.bg – official website

Electric power companies of Bulgaria